James Ernest Alexander (15 March 1899 – 2 December 1972) was an Australian rules footballer who played with Essendon in the Victorian Football League (VFL).

Notes

External links 
		

1899 births
1972 deaths
Australian rules footballers from Victoria (Australia)
Essendon Football Club players
Australian military personnel of World War I